Sergey Betov and Ilya Ivashka were the defending champions but only Ivashka chose to defend his title, partnering Aldin Šetkić. Ivashka lost in the semifinals to Lukáš Rosol and Franko Škugor.

Hans Podlipnik-Castillo and Andrei Vasilevski won the title after defeating Rosol and Škugor 6–3, 7–6(7–4) in the final.

Seeds

Draw

References
 Main Draw

Tilia Slovenia Open - Doubles
2017 Doubles